The Minister of Science and Culture is one of the Finnish Government's ministerial positions.

The Marin Cabinet's incumbent Minister of Science and Culture is Petri Honkonen of the Centre Party.

References 

Lists of government ministers of Finland